Wildwood, Oregon may refer to:

Wildwood, Clackamas County, Oregon
Wildwood Recreation Site, near Wildwood in Clackamas County
Wildwood, Lane County, Oregon